Jagdishpur Assembly constituency may refer to

 Jagdishpur, Bihar Assembly constituency
 Jagdishpur, Uttar Pradesh Assembly constituency